The 1915 Tempe Normal Owls football team was an American football team that represented Tempe Normal School (later renamed Arizona State University) as an independent during the 1915 college football season. In their second season under head coach George Schaeffer, the Owls compiled a 3–2 record and were outscored by their opponents by a combined total of 125 to 36. The team's games included a 7–0 loss in the Arizona–Arizona State football rivalry. Kelly Moeur was the team captain.

Schedule

References

Tempe Normal
Arizona State Sun Devils football seasons
Tempe Normal Owls football